Petrovsk (also Petrovsk South) is an former air base in Russia located 3 km south of Petrovsk.

From 1960 to 1971 the 478th Training Aviation Regiment, initially flying Ilyushin Il-12s and Ilyushin Il-14s, was stationed at the Borisoglebsk. It moved in 1971 to Petrovsk. It was part of the Balashov Higher Military Aviation School of Pilots. It was reduced in size in 1994, and disbanded in 1998.

Since the disbandment of the 478th Training Aviation Regiment, the aerodrome has not been used.

References

External links
RussianAirFields.com

Soviet Air Force bases
Russian Air Force bases
Buildings and structures in Saratov Oblast